Seizer is a 2018 Indian Kannada-language crime action film written, directed and co-produced by Vinay Krishna, making his debut. It features Chiranjeevi Sarja and Parul Yadav along with V. Ravichandran in the lead roles. The supporting cast includes Prakash Raj and Telugu actor Nagineedu, making his Kannada debut. The score and soundtrack for the film is by rapper Chandan Shetty and the cinematography is by Anji and Rajesh Kata.

Announced on 9 November 2015, the project went through a development hell and got revived in November 2016. Besides Bangalore, the filming took place in Mysore and the climax scene was shot at Sabarimala in Kerala.

Cast
 Chiranjeevi Sarja as Seizer
 Prakash Raj as Bhupathi
 V. Ravichandran as Seizer's Boss
 Ravi Prakash as Ravi, Police Officer 
 Parul Yadav 
 Nagineedu
 Sadhu Kokila
 Avinash
 Ramesh Bhat

Soundtrack

The film's background score and the soundtracks are composed, written and sung by Chandan Shetty. The music rights were acquired by Ananda Audio.

Reception

Critical response 

Sunayana Suresh of The Times of India gave the film a rating of 2.5/5 and wrote "All said, Seizer isn't a bad option for people who are looking for a dose of routine commercial drama. If you're a fan of Chiranjeevi Sarja, Ravichandran or Prakash Raj, this might be of interest to you. Go ahead and give it a try". Vijaya Karnataka wrote "Though director Vinay Krishna has promised to make his debut, there is a need to focus more on story and screenplay. Those who like buildup films can watch cinema".

References

External links
 

2010s Kannada-language films
2018 crime action films
Indian crime action films
2018 directorial debut films
Films shot in Mysore
Films shot in Bangalore
Films scored by Chandan Shetty